Walimuni Mudiyanselage Menake Hemaal Rajapakse (මේනක රාජපක්ශ  born 24 May 1983), is a Sri Lankan teledrama actor and model. He was first cast in 2005 as one of the main actors, but the role changed into a lead, in the teledrama Sanda Mudunata, which was telecast on Swarnavahini in 2005.

He had acted in more than 30 teledramas and 3 films as of 2015.

Early life

Menake is the second child of his family. His father Ivan Rajapakse was an executive who worked in the hotel industry and died in 2004. His mother Zareena Allang, is a Malay and was a teacher at Wycherly International School. He is a past pupil of St. Peter's College, Colombo.

Career
He was first sighted by a teledrama producer Samy Pavel during a SAAF Games in 2005. He is a competitive swimmer and broke a national level record.

In 2005, Menaka was selected for a main role in the teledrama Sanda Mudunata directed by Samy Pavel.

He became popular in 2008, in the teledrama Muthu Kirilli and then acted in many television serials such as Ran Dam Wal, Monara Kadadasi and Adare Ahasa Tharam. His first film was Sinhawalokanaya, a sport-drama film. He also acted in the crime thriller film Train to Kandy.

Selected television serials
 Adare Ahasa Tharam
 Ahas Maliga
 Amanda
 Ammawarune
 Ayemath Adaren
 Bharyawo
 Isira Bhawana
 Jeewa Chakra 
 Kumee 
 Monara Kadadasi
 Muthu Kirilli
 Piyasa
 Queen
 Ralla Veralata Adarei
 Ran Dam Wal
 Sanda Mudunata
 Sihina Piyapath
 Situ Medura 
 Lanvee

Personal life
Menaka married Virangi Siriwardena in 2010. They divorced in 2013,. He is married to fellow actress Nehara Peiris in 2014. Nehara and Menaka acted in lead roles on many occasions. They first met in Muthu Kirilli, and followed in Amanda, Bharyawo, Ammawarune, Situ Medura and others.

Filmography

References

External links

Nehara & Menaka in USA for “Adaraneeya Niagara”
නමක් අමතක වුණා නම් සොරි අපි රට හැර ගියා...
ලක්‍ෂපතියේ ලක්‍ෂ පහ දිනූ මේනක සරසවියට හෙළි කළ රහස
මේනක - නෙහාරා සමඟ සෘජු කතාබහක්
මේනක, නෙහාරාට ප්‍රශ්නාවලියක්
මේනක රාජපක්ෂ ගැන අම්මා සරීනා ගේ මතකය
ඉක්මනින් මවක්වෙන්න ආසයි - Nehara Pieris

Living people
1989 births
Sri Lankan male television actors
Sinhalese male actors
Sri Lankan male film actors
Alumni of St. Peter's College, Colombo